Betis can refer to:
 The Latin name of the Guadalquivir river, which with its surrounding area constituted a province of the Roman Empire
 Real Betis, a football team based in Seville
 Betis Deportivo Balompié, the reserve team of Real Betis
 A district in the Philippine municipality of Guagua, Pampanga
 Betis Church, a Roman Catholic church in Guagua, Philippines
 The Indonesian and Malay word for calf